Purpletop is a common name for several plants and may refer to:

Tridens flavus, purpletop tridens
Verbena bonariensis, purpletop vervain